William Bernard McGrorty (August 16, 1825 in Inver, Ireland – February 16, 1865 in La Crosse, Wisconsin) was a member of the Minnesota House of Representatives

Career
McGrorty was a member of the House of Representatives from 1857 to 1858.

References

Members of the Minnesota House of Representatives
Irish emigrants to the United States (before 1923)
1825 births
1865 deaths
19th-century American politicians